St Albans City may refer to:

 The city of St Albans, Hertfordshire, UK
 The City of St Albans, the local government district covering the city and surrounding area
 St Albans City F.C., a football club in St Albans
 St Albans City railway station, the city's main station

 St. Albans, a city in Vermont, USA.